Drakino is a rural locality (a selo) in Liskinsky District of Voronezh Oblast, Russia.

Population:

References

Rural localities in Liskinsky District